The Kymi is a river in Finland. It begins at Lake Päijänne, flows through the provinces of Päijänne Tavastia, Uusimaa and Kymenlaakso and discharges into the Gulf of Finland. The river passes the towns of Heinola and Kouvola. The town of Kotka is located on the river delta. The name of the river, itself, kymi, means "large river", in Old Finnish.

Being one of the largest rivers in Southern Finland, the Kymi is a major source of hydroelectricity. The towns of Kotka, Kuusankoski, Myllykoski and Inkeroinen along the river are major centres of the pulp and paper industry. Formerly the river was extensively used for timber rafting.

The Kymijoki river has five mouths. The eastern branch splits into the Korkeakoski and Koivukoski branches, the latter branch dividing again to form two mouths (Langinkoski and Huumanhaara). The Korkeakoski branch has only one river mouth.

The western branch divides into Ahvenkoski and Klåsarö branches, each with one mouth.
 
The westernmost Ahvenkoski branch of the river served as a border between Sweden and Russia from 1743 to 1809. The parts of Finland east of the river were later called Old Finland. Old Finland was incorporated in the Grand Duchy of Finland in 1812.

The Kymi is very swift: it takes three days for its waters to run from lake Pyhäjärvi to sea.

Hydroelectric plants and rapids

In Kymijoki, there are 12 hydroelectric plants and several dams to regulate the water level. The first power plants were built is 1882. The canal and dam at Kalkkinen is used to regulate the water level of Lake Päijänne. The Hirvivuolle Dam regulates water flow between eastern and western branches. The Paaskoski Dam near Tammijärvi regulates the flow into the Klåsarö branch and the Strömfors Dam regulates the water level of the Strömfors industrial area.

Upper and middle reaches:
Kalkkistenkoski rapids and regulating dam (Asikkala) 
Jyrängönkoski rapids (Heinola)
Vuolenkoski, hydroelectric plant (Iitti)
Mankala, hydroelectric plant (Iitti)
Voikkaa, hydroelectric plant (Kouvola)
Pessankoski rapids (Kouvola)
Lappakoski rapids (Kouvola)
Kuusankoski, hydroelectric plant (Kouvola)
Keltti, hydroelectric plant (Kouvola)
Myllykoski, hydroelectric plant (Kouvola)
Anjalankoski (Ankkapurha), hydroelectric plant (Kouvola)
Piirteenkoski rapids (Kouvola)
Susikoski rapids (At the boundary of Kouvola and ja Kotka)
Ahvionkoski rapids area, elevation 1,9 m (At the boundary of Kouvola and Kotka)
Kultaankosket rapids, elevation 1,5 m (At the boundary of Kouvola and Kotka)

Western branch:
Hirvivuolle, regulating dam, built in 1933 (Pyhtää)
Hirvikoski rapids (Pyhtää)
Paaskoski, regulating dam, built in 1933(At the boundary of Pyhtää and Loviisa)
Klåsarö (Loosarinkoski), hydroelectric plant (Pyhtää)
Ediskoski, hydroelectric plant (Pyhtää)
Strömfors, regulating dam, built in 1965 (Loviisa)
Ahvenkoski, hydroelectric plant (At the boundary of Pyhtää and Loviisa)

Eastern branch:
Pernoonkosket rapids area, elevation 5 m (Kotka)
Laajakoski rapids (cleared away, Kotka)
Koivukoski, hydroelectric plant and regulating dam (Koivukoski branch, Kotka)
Siikakoski rapids (Koivukoski branch, Kotka)
Kokonkoski rapids (Koivukoski branch, Kotka)
Langinkoski rapids (Langinkoski branch, Kotka)
Hinttulankoski rapids (Huumanhaara branch, Kotka)
Korkeakoski, hydroelectric plant (Korkeakoski branch, Kotka)

See also
 Kymi, former municipality of Finland

References

External links 

  Kymi river

 
Rivers of Finland